Hackberry School District 3 is a public school district based in Mohave County, Arizona.

Its sole school, a K-8 school, is called Cedar Hills Elementary School.

Most of Hackberry is in the district boundary, as well as almost all of Grand Canyon West.

References

External links
 

School districts in Mohave County, Arizona
Public K–8 schools in Arizona